In atmospheric science, a cold pool (CP) is a cold pocket of dense air that forms when rain evaporates during intense precipitation e.g. underneath a thunderstorm cloud. Typically, CPs spread at 10 m/s and last 2–3 hours.

Characteristics
CPs spread radially away from the rain event along the surface as a moving gust front. When the gust front passes, CPs cause an increase in wind speed and a sudden drop in specific humidity and in air temperature. In large-eddy simulations, they reach 10 km in radius, whereas, in reality, they can become as large as 50–100 km in radius. Collisions between multiple CPs can trigger the formation of a new thunderstorm event, and thereby form a new CP.

See also
Cold drop

References 

Severe weather and convection

fr:Goutte froide#Goutte méso